The 128th Ohio Infantry Regiment, sometimes 128th Ohio Volunteer Infantry (or 128th OVI) was an infantry regiment in the Union Army during the American Civil War.

Service
The 128th Ohio Infantry was organized in Columbus and Johnson's Island, Ohio and mustered in for three years service under the command of Colonel Charles W. Hill.  Companies A through E were organized January through September 1862; Companies E through K were organized December 1863 through January 1864.

The regiment moved from Columbus to Sandusky, Ohio, January 1864. It performed guard duty at Sandusky and at Johnson's Island, Sandusky Bay, until July 1865.  Portions of the regiment served on detached duty in West Virginia.  The regiment moved to Camp Chase July 10, and mustered out of service on July 17, 1865.

Casualties
The regiment lost a total of 64 men during service; 1 officer and 63 enlisted men died of disease.

Commanders
 Colonel Charles W. Hill
 Lieutenant Colonel Thomas H. Linnell

See also

 List of Ohio Civil War units
 Ohio in the Civil War

References
 Dyer, Frederick H. A Compendium of the War of the Rebellion (Des Moines, IA:  Dyer Pub. Co.), 1908.
 Ohio Roster Commission. Official Roster of the Soldiers of the State of Ohio in the War on the Rebellion, 1861–1865, Compiled Under the Direction of the Roster Commission (Akron, OH: Werner Co.), 1886–1895.
 Reid, Whitelaw. Ohio in the War: Her Statesmen, Her Generals, and Soldiers (Cincinnati, OH: Moore, Wilstach, & Baldwin), 1868.
Attribution

External links
 Ohio in the Civil War: 128th Ohio Volunteer Infantry by Larry Stevens
 National flag of the 128th Ohio Infantry
 Regimental flag of the 128th Ohio Infantry
 History of the Johnson's Island garrison

Military units and formations established in 1862
Military units and formations disestablished in 1865
Units and formations of the Union Army from Ohio
1862 establishments in Ohio